Religion in Slovakia is predominantly Christianity, adhered to by about 68.8% of the population in 2021, a decrease from 75.5% in 2011 and 83.8% in 2001. Catholicism is the major Christian tradition in the country, followed in 2021 by 59.8% of the population, a majority of whom (55.8%) were of the Roman Catholic Church and a minority of whom (4%) were of the Slovak Greek Catholic Church. About 9% of the population were mostly followers of Protestantism, and a minority of Eastern Orthodox Christianity and other Christian denominations; the major groupings are the Evangelical Church of the Augsburg Confession in Slovakia (5.3%), the Reformed Christian Church in Slovakia (1.6%), the Czech and Slovak Orthodox Church (0.9%), the Jehovah's Witnesses (0.3%), and other smaller Christian denominations (0.9%). In 2021, about 23.8% of the population declared themselves not religious, an increase from 13.4% in 2011. An additional 1.2% of the population were followers of other religions or beliefs; small religious minorities in Slovakia include Buddhism, modern Paganism, Islam, Judaism, Jediism, Hinduism, Pastafarianism and others.

Demographics

Census statistics, 1900–2021

Line chart of the trends, 1900–2021 
Census statistics 1900–2021:

Religions

Christianity 

According to the 2021 census, Christianity was the religion of 68.8% of the population of Slovakia, of whom 59.8% were Catholics (55.8% adherents of the Roman Catholics and 4% of the Slovak Greek Catholic Church), 5.3% were adherents of the Evangelical Church of the Augsburg Confession in Slovakia, 1.6% of the Reformed Christian Church in Slovakia, 0.9% of the Czech and Slovak Orthodox Church, 0.3% were Jehovah's Witnesses, and another 0.9% were followers of other Christian denominations. In Slovakia there are also small numbers of adherents of various other Christian denominations, including Adventism, Apostolic Pentecostalism, Baptists, Brethren, Hussitism, Irvingism (New Apostolicism), Methodism and Old Catholicism.

Other religions 

Minority religions in Slovakia, according to the 2021 census, included 6,722 adherents of Buddhism (0.1% of the population), 3,862 adherents of Islam (0.1%), 2,007 adherents of Judaism (<0.1%), 1,389 adherents of Jediism (<0.1%), and even smaller minorities of people professing Hindusim, Pastafarianism, the Baháʼí Faith and other religions. There are organisations of practitioners of Slavic Rodnovery in Slovakia, part of the 0.1% of the population (4,007 people) who in the 2021 census identified themselves as Pagans. Rodnover organisations in the country include the Native Circle (Rodný Kruh), one of whose prominent members, Žiarislav Švitsky, initiated in 2001 one of the most influential leaders of Czech Rodnovery, Richard Bigl. Other groups are the Holy Grove of Native Faith (Svätoháj Rodnej Viery), and the Civic Association Tartaria (Občianske združenie Tartaria), which caters to followers of the Rodnover doctrine of Ynglism. Another Pagan religion present in the country is Mesopotamian Zuism; some members of the Slovak Zuist community were also involved in the development of the Icelandic church of the movement.

Legislation and freedom of religion 

The laws of Slovakia guarantee the freedom of religious belief and criminalise the defamation of and discrimination against religious groups. Religious groups may register with the government in order to receive certain privileges, but the threshold of membership required for new groups to register is high, 50,000 members. Government officials have explicitly stated that preventing Islamic organizations from registering is a reason for this requirement. According to non-governmental organisations and unregistered religious groups, negative attitudes toward unregistered religious groups are common, and hate speech online against religious minorities, especially represented by refugees, is frequent. Politicians from far-right parties in the National Council, the legislative organ of Slovakia, frequently espouse Islamophobic and antisemitic ideas and conspiracy theories, and some of them have faced censure as a consequence of their violation of laws against the propagation of extremist materials and against affiliation with groups dedicated to the suppression of fundamental rights and freedoms.

See also 

 Religion in the Czech Republic

References

Citations

Sources